Robert Dennis Scrabis (born March 26, 1936) is a former American football player who played with the New York Titans. He played college football at Pennsylvania State University. 

He is the father of Bob Scrabis, who was the 1989 Ivy League Men's Basketball Player of the Year. Scrabis has been a resident of Avon-by-the-Sea, New Jersey. From 1969 to 2012 operated an auto dealership that he took over from his father-in-law in Lakewood, New Jersey.

References

1936 births
Living people
American football quarterbacks
Penn State Nittany Lions football players
New York Titans (AFL) players
People from Avon-by-the-Sea, New Jersey
Players of American football from Pittsburgh